Mariano Barbaresi (7 June 1895 in Rome – 17 October 1928) was an Italian boxer who competed in the 1920 Summer Olympics. In 1920 he was eliminated in the first round of the heavyweight class after losing his fight to the upcoming bronze medalist Xavier Eluère.

References

External links
Mariano Barbaresi's profile at Sports Reference.com
Italian Olympians BARA-BARB 

1895 births
1928 deaths
Boxers from Rome
Heavyweight boxers
Olympic boxers of Italy
Boxers at the 1920 Summer Olympics
Italian male boxers